Laughton is a British surname. Notable people with the surname include:

Alaine Laughton (born 1978), Jamaican singer-songwriter
Charles Laughton (1899–1962), English actor and film director
Charles E. Laughton (1846–1895), American politician and lawyer
Dale Laughton (born 1970), Scottish rugby league player
Dot Laughton (1913–1982), Australian cricketer
Doug Laughton, English rugby league player and coach
Eddie Laughton (1903–1952), English actor
Gail Laughton (1921–1985), American jazz harpist
Herbie Laughton (born 1927), Australian singer
John George Laughton (1891–1965), New Zealand missionary
John Knox Laughton (1830–1915), English naval historian
Michael Laughton (born 1934), British electrical engineer
Mike Laughton (born 1944), Canadian ice hockey player
Richard Laughton (died 1723), English Anglican priest and academic
Scott Laughton (born 1994), Canadian ice hockey player
Stacie Laughton, American politician
Stuart Laughton (born 1951), Canadian musician
William Laughton (1812-1897) Moderator of the General Assembly of the Free Church of Scotland

English-language surnames

English versions of the surname origins are usually quoted as "Anglo Saxon" in origin and associated with the growing of Leeks. This may be accurate in the context of the name in parts of England but does not take account of other narratives. It is entirely possible that the name Laughton has two separate root origins which converged as a result of trade and other pressures. This appears to relate to the formation of the Hudson Bay Company in Canada which recruited heavily from Orkney but also in England. 
Laughton is most recorded as most prolific in Yorkshire England but is also ranked 23 in the commonality of surnames in Orkney. This may indicate a Scandinavian origin as both regions have historic links to Denmark and Norway arising from Viking invasions. 
In Orkney, the name may have origins in the surname "Lachtane" or Lauchtain which can be traced to 1494ad in the kings' records of that period. The impignoration of sovereignty from Norway to Scotland occurred officially at that time but had been in process for decades prior to that. The infusion of Lowland Scots loyal to the Stewart king to Orkney is a contender for the origin of the surname Lachtane or Lauchtain (Laughton) in Orkney. 
The pronunciation of the original name in Orkney also suggests a probability of origin in the Irish Gaelic surname O' Lachtnain translating as "Grey". The word "Loaghtan" on the Isle of Man refers to a colour of a wool which contains elements of gray. The breed of sheep referred to now as " Manx Loaghtan" is highly likely to have the same root as the original Gaelic word "Lachtnain".

https://www.ancestry.co.uk/name-origin?surname=laughton#:~:text=Laughton%20Family%20History-,Laughton%20Name%20Meaning,farm%20where%20leeks%20are%20grown%27.

https://www.oldscottish.com/orkney.html

https://www.libraryireland.com/names/ol/o-lachtnain.php

https://en.wikipedia.org/wiki/Manx_Loaghtan